Dacrydium lycopodioides is a species of conifer in the family Podocarpaceae. It is found only in New Caledonia. It is threatened by habitat loss.

References

lycopodioides
Conservation dependent plants
Endemic flora of New Caledonia
Taxonomy articles created by Polbot
Taxa named by Adolphe-Théodore Brongniart
Taxa named by Jean Antoine Arthur Gris